The 101st Infantry Division was a division of the Philippine Army under the United States Army Forces in the Far East (USAFFE).

Organization

History
It was active from 1941 to 10 May 1942, whereupon it surrendered after Corregidor fell.  It was active in Mindanao.  Col. (later BGen.) Joseph P. Vachon (USA) was the division's commander, and Vachon simultaneously commanded the Cotabato-Davao Force, Mindanao Force. Col. Eustaquio S. Baclig (PA), a 1918 U.S. Military Academy graduate, was his chief of staff.

Combat Narrative
After the Japanese invasion of the Philippines in December 1941, it formed part of Visayan-Mindanao Force under Brigadier General (later Major General) William F. Sharp, HQ originally at Cebu City.

Order of battle
 101st Infantry Regiment (PA) (LCol. John H. McGee)
 102nd Infantry Regiment (PA)
 103rd Infantry Regiment (PA) (Maj. Joseph R. Webb) (transferred to 102nd Division (PA))
 104th Provisional Infantry Regiment (PA)  
 101st Field Artillery Regiment (PA)
 101st FA Regt HQ Company (PA)
 1st Bn/101st FA Regt (PA) (2.95-inch pack howitzers, 4x) (guns & ammo never arrived; sunk on the SS Corregidor, 17 Dec 41) 
 2nd Bn/101st FA Regt (PA) 
 3rd Bn/101st FA Regt (PA) 
 101st Engineer Battalion (PA)
 101st Division Units (PA) 
 101st Division Headquarters & HQ Company (PA)
 101st Medical Battalion (PA) 
 101st Signal Company (PA) 
 101st Quartermaster Company (Motorized) (PA) 
 101st QM Transport Company (Truck) (PA)

Sources

Bibliography
Morton, Louis. The Fall of the Philippines (Publication 5-2) . Retrieved on 14 Feb 2017.

References

Infantry divisions of the Philippines
Military units and formations of the Philippine Army in World War II
Military units and formations established in 1941
Military units and formations disestablished in 1942